There are at least 143 named lakes and reservoirs in Powder River County, Montana.

Reservoirs
 Anderson Reservoir, el. 
 Anderson Reservoir, el. 
 Antelope Reservoir (Montana), el. 
 Ash Creek Reservoir, el. 
 Ash Creek Reservoir Number Two, el. 
 Basin Reservoir, el. 
 Black Canyon Reservoir (Montana), el. 
 Bloom Creek Reservoir Number One, el. 
 Bloom Creek Reservoir Number Two, el. 
 Boundary Reservoir, el. 
 Boundary Reservoir, el. 
 Bowers Reservoir, el. 
 Buck Pasture Reservoirs, el. 
 Buckberry Reservoir, el. 
 Bull Reservoir, el. 
 Burnside Reservoir, el. 
 CCC Reservoir, el. 
 CCC Reservoir, el. 
 Callaway Reservoir, el. 
 Cameron Reservoir, el. 
 Canyon Reservoir (Montana), el. 
 Chromo Reservoir, el. 
 Clay Reservoir, el. 
 Cloudburst Reservoir, el. 
 Coal Creek Reservoir, el. 
 Coal Creek Reservoir, el. 
 Coleman Reservoir, el. 
 Cook Creek Reservoir, el. 
 Cottonwood Reservoir, el. 
 Cow Creek Reservoir, el. 
 Crowfoot Reservoir, el. 
 Cub Creek Reservoir, el. 
 Daily Reservoir, el. 
 Daily Reservoir, el. 
 Dam Creek Reservoir, el. 
 Deer Creek Reservoir Number One, el. 
 Deer Creek Reservoir Number Three, el. 
 Deer Creek Reservoir Number Two, el. 
 Detborn Reservoir, el. 
 Diamond Butte Reservoir Number One, el. 
 Diamond Butte Reservoir Number Two, el. 
 Doubtful Reservoir, el. 
 Drop Tube Reservoir, el. 
 Dry Gulch Reservoir, el. 
 Dunning Reservoir, el. 
 Dunning Reservoir, el. 
 Elk Creek Reservoir Number One, el. 
 Elk Creek Reservoir Number Three, el. 
 Elk Creek Reservoir Number Two, el. 
 Elk Ridge Reservoir, el. 
 Erickson Reservoir, el. 
 Fifteenmile Reservoir Number One, el. 
 Fifteenmile Reservoir Number Two, el. 
 Fletcher Reservoir, el. 
 Fly Creek Reservoir, el. 
 Forsgreen Reservoir, el. 
 Garr Reservoir, el. 
 Gaskill Reservoir, el. 
 Gaskill Reservoir, el. 
 Gene Creek Reservoir, el. 
 Goodspeed Draw Reservoir, el. 
 Griffin Pass Reservoir, el. 
 Hailstone Reservoir, el. 
 Halfway Reservoir, el. 
 Hanic Reservoir, el. 
 Happy Coulee Reservoir, el. 
 Hazel Reservoir, el. 
 Hint Reservoirs, el. 
 Hondu Reservoir, el. 
 Horse Pasture Reservoir, el. 
 Howard Reservoir, el. 
 Howes Reservoir, el. 
 Howes Reservoir, el. 
 Indian Creek Reservoir, el. 
 Indian Creek Reservoir Number One, el. 
 Indian Creek Reservoir Number Two, el. 
 John Gold Reservoir, el. 
 Knudson Reservoir, el. 
 Kueffer Reservoir, el. 
 Last Chance Reservoir, el. 
 Logging Creek Reservoir, el. 
 Lost Creek Reservoir, el. 
 Lower Coal Creek Reservoir, el. 
 Lower Wilbur Reservoir, el. 
 Lyon Creek Divide Reservoir, el. 
 Main Ash Reservoir, el. 
 Mason Reservoir, el. 
 McLatchy Reservoir, el. 
 Miller Draw Reservoir, el. 
 Moody Reservoir, el. 
 Morris Reservoir, el. 
 Mud Turtle Reservoir, el. 
 Necessity Reservoir, el. 
 Oil Well Reservoir, el. 
 Paget Reservoir Number Four, el. 
 Paget Reservoir Number One, el. 
 Paget Reservoir Number Three, el. 
 Paget Reservoir Number Two, el. 
 Phillips Reservoir, el. 
 Pierce Reservoir, el. 
 Plum Creek Reservoir, el. 
 Price Reservoir, el. 
 Rainey Reservoir, el. 
 Reanus Reservoir, el. 
 Ridenour Reservoir, el. 
 Rimrock Reservoir, el. 
 Road Creek Reservoir, el. 
 Road Reservoir, el. 
 Rocky Crossing Reservoir, el. 
 Rocky Draw Reservoir, el. 
 Sanburn Reservoir, el. 
 Sand Rock Reservoir, el. 
 Sartin Draw Reservoir, el. 
 Sawmill Reservoir, el. 
 Schiller Reservoir, el. 
 Seymour Reservoir, el. 
 Shady Rest Reservoir, el. 
 Sheep Creek Reservoir, el. 
 Shell Reservoir, el. 
 Shorty Creek Reservoir, el. 
 Shorty Ridge Reservoir, el. 
 Shy Reservoir, el. 
 Simon Reservoir, el. 
 Slough Grass Reservoir, el. 
 Smith Reservoir, el. 
 Stewart Reservoir, el. 
 Stewart Reservoir Number Two, el. 
 Straight Creek Reservoir, el. 
 Swope Reservoir, el. 
 Taylor Creek Reservoir Number One, el. 
 Taylor Creek Reservoir Number Two, el. 
 Tobin Reservoir, el. 
 Tooley Creek Reservoir, el. 
 Trout Pond, el. 
 Turtle Reservoir, el. 
 Two Buck Reservoir, el. 
 Vannett Reservoir, el. 
 Well Reservoir, el. 
 Williams Reservoir, el. 
 Willow Creek Reservoir, el. 
 Wynkoop Reservoir, el. 
 Wynkoop SU Reservoir, el. 
 Yankee Reservoir, el.

See also
 List of lakes in Montana

Notes

Bodies of water of Powder River County, Montana
Powder